Hemingby is a dispersed village and civil parish in the East Lindsey district of Lincolnshire, England. It is surrounded by the villages of Baumber, Goulceby and West Ashby. The River Bain and its tributary, the Hemingby Beck, flow through the village.

Hemingby Grade II listed Anglican parish church is dedicated to St. Margaret. Originating in the 14th century it was rebuilt in 1764, and again in 1895.

In 1885 Kelly's noted that one of the principal landowners was Earl Manvers. A then reported 1859 Weslyan Methodist chapel building still exists. A free school was founded in 1727 by Jane Lady Dymoke; her endowment provided for the employment of a school master and mistress, and for the clothing and apprenticeship of school children. She also established four almshouses for poor widows; these are today listed buildings. Further listed buildings are the late 18th-century Rookery cottage, and the mid-18th-century Old Rectory with its early 19th-century coach house.

The Methodist chapel existed as such until 1978, the building being converted to a private house in 2007.

The village Coach and Horses public house is a former coaching inn on the old Louth to Lincoln coaching route.

On 18 April 2007 Radio Lincolnshire briefly changed its name to BBC Radio Hemingby for a day, and broadcast from the village.

References

External links 

"Hemingby", Genuki.org.uk. Retrieved 14 October 2011
Village web site

Villages in Lincolnshire
Civil parishes in Lincolnshire
East Lindsey District